The Vanua Levu Group is an archipelago in northern Fiji. It takes its name from its predominant island, Vanua Levu. Among the other island in the group, the most important is Taveuni. Other islands in the group include Laucala, Matagi, Namena Lala, Qamea, Rabi, Vorovoro and Yadua Tabu.

The Vanua Levu Group is coextensive with Fiji's Northern Division, one of four into which the country is divided for local government purposes.  Together with the remote Lau Islands, they form the Tovata Confederacy, one of three chiefly hierarchies.

.
Archipelagoes of Fiji
Archipelagoes of the Pacific Ocean